The Choctaw language, spoken by the Choctaw, an Indigenous people of the Southeastern Woodlands, is part of the Muskogean language family. Chickasaw is a separate but closely related language to Choctaw.

The Choctaw Nation of Oklahoma published the New Choctaw dictionary in 2016.

Orthography

The written Choctaw language is based upon the English version of the Roman alphabet and was developed in conjunction with the "civilization program" of the United States, a program to westernize and forcefully assimilate Indigenous Americans, particularly those adhering to what were to become the Five Civilized Tribes (of which the Choctaw are a part) into Anglo-American Culture and Sympathies during the early 19th century. Although there are other variations of the Choctaw alphabet, the three most commonly seen are the Byington (Traditional), Byington/Swanton (Linguistic), and Modern (Mississippi Choctaw).

Many publications by linguists about the Choctaw language use a slight variant of the "modern (Mississippi Choctaw)" orthography listed here, where long vowels are written as doubled. In the "linguistic" version, the acute accent shows the position of the pitch accent, rather than the length of the vowel.

The discussion of Choctaw grammar below uses the linguistic variant of the orthography.

 Choctaw Bible Translation Committee
 Substituted with 'v' according to typesetting or encoding constraints.
 The former is used before a vowel; the latter, before a consonant. The intervocalic use of <hl> conflated the common consonant cluster /hl/ with /ɬ/.
 Dictionary editors John Swanton and Henry Halbert systematically replaced all instances of <hl> with <ł>, regardless whether <hl> stood for /ɬ/ or /hl/. Despite the editors' systematic replacement of all <hl> with <ł>, the digraph <lh> was allowed to stand.

Dialects
There are three dialects of Choctaw (Mithun 1999):

 "Native" Choctaw on the Choctaw Nation in southeastern Oklahoma
 Mississippi Choctaw of Oklahoma on Chickasaw Nation of south-central Oklahoma (near Durwood)
 Choctaw of the Mississippi Band of Choctaw Indians near Philadelphia, Mississippi

Other speakers live near Tallahassee, Florida, and with the Koasati in Louisiana, and also a few speakers live in Texas and California.

Phonology
 More information on suffixes is in the Morphology section.

Consonants

Also, the voiceless stops are slightly aspirated at the onset of words and before stressed syllables, behaving like English voiceless plosives.
 Controversially, some analyses suggest that all nouns end in an underlying consonant phoneme. Nouns apparently ending in a vowel actually have a glottal stop  or a glottal fricative  as the final consonant. Such consonants become realized when suffixes are attached.

Free variation
 There is free variation of some consonants in Choctaw with some speakers:
 /ɬ/, the voiceless lateral fricative, is pronounced as a voiceless dental fricative [θ]: →.
 The voiceless labiodental fricative /f/ is pronounced as a voiceless bilabial fricative [ɸ]: →.

Phonological processes of consonants
 →/V_V
 imofi-aki-lih→imofiy-əɣə̃:-lih

 The voiceless glottal fricative  is often pronounced like a voiceless palatal fricative  when it precedes the voiceless palato-alveolar affricate .
 →/_
 katihchish→katiçtʃiʃ

Vowels

  Lax vowels occur more often in closed syllables. In traditional orthography, ʋ usually indicates  and u usually indicates . The traditional orthography doesn't distinguish lax and tense front vowels; instead it indicates  with e.
  Nasal vowels are intrinsically long.

Pitch
 In Choctaw, very few words are distinguished only by pitch accent. Nouns in Choctaw have pitch realization at the penultimate syllable or the ultimate syllable. Verbs in Choctaw will have pitch realization at morphemes indicating tense, but sometimes, pitch directly precedes the tense morpheme.

Syllable structure

 As is in the chart above, there are three syllable structure types in Choctaw: light, heavy, and super heavy. Possible syllables in Choctaw must contain at least one vowel of any quality.
 Syllables cannot end with a consonant clusters CC. However, there is an exception with the structure *(C)VCC if a word in Choctaw ends with the suffix /-t/.
 Syllables do not begin with consonant clusters CC, but there is an exception in an initial /i-/ deletion, which results in a syllable *CCV .

Rhythmic lengthening
 Rhythmic lengthening is the process of lengthening the vowel duration of an even-numbered CV syllable in Choctaw. However, vowels at the end of words are not permitted to undergo that process. Also, if an even-numbered syllable is a verbal prefixes class I or III, the affix's vowel may not undergo lengthening, and the same holds true for noun prefixes class III as well.
 CV-CV-CVC→CV-CV:-CVC
salahatok→sala:hatok

Smallest possible word
 The smallest possible word in Choctaw must contain either two short vowels or one long vowel.
 a:t

 /a-/ insertion: there are verbs with only one short vowel in their roots. Without an affix attached to the verb root, the verbs become impossible utterances because Choctaw requires either two short vowels or a long vowel for a word to be formed. An initial A-prefix is thus attached to the root of the verb.
 *bih → a-bih

Phonological processes

Glide insertion
 When a verb root ends with a long vowel, a glide /w/ or /j/ is inserted after the long vowel.
 ∅→/wa/ / V:
 Where V: is oo
 boo-a-h→bóowah
 ∅→/ja/ / V:
 Where V: can be either ii or aa
 talaa-a-h→talaayah

/i-/ deletion
 In Choctaw, there is a group of nouns which contain an initial /i-/ that encodes for 3rd person possession. It may be deleted, but if the /i/ is part of a VC syllable structure, the C is also deleted, because the resulting CCV syllable is rarely a permissible syllable structure at the onset of words.
/i/→∅ / #
 Part 1: /i + C/→∅ + /C/ / # 
 Part 2: /∅ + C/→∅ / #
ippókni'→ppókni'→pókni'

/-l-/ infix assimilation
 The verbal infix /l/ is pronounced /h, ch, or ɬ/ when /l/ precedes a voiceless consonant.
l → {h, tʃ, ɬ} /_C[-voice]
ho-l-tinah → ho-ɬ-tinah

Phonological processes of the suffix /-li/

 There are several assimilation processes that occur with the suffix /-li/. When the verbal suffix /-li/ is preceded by /f/ /ɫ/ /h/ /m/ /n/ or /w/, the /l/ assimilates to the corresponding consonant that precedes it. Also, the verbal suffix /-li/ is preceded by the consonant /b/, the /l/ is realized as /b/. Third, when the verbal suffix /-li/ is preceded by the consonant /p/, the /p/ is pronounced as /b/. Lastly, when the verbal suffix /-li/ is preceded by the consonant /t/, the /t/ is pronounced as /l/.
/l/→/f, ɫ, h, m, n, w/ / /f, ɫ, h, m, n, w/
 /kobaf-li-h/→ kobaaffih

 /l/→/b/ / /b/
 /atob-li-h/→ atobbih

 /p/→/b/ / /b/
 /tap-li-h/→ tablih

 /t/→/l/ / /l/
 /palhat-li-h/→ pallalih

 There are two deletion processes that occur with the suffix /-li/. If the verbal suffix /-li/ precedes the verbal suffix /-tʃi/, the suffix /-li/ may be deleted if the resulting syllable, after deletion, is a consonant cluster. The other process occurs when the verbal suffix /-li/ precedes the suffix /-t/, which results with the suffix /-li/ being sometimes deleted if the syllable /-li/ has not already gone under phonological processes as described above.
/li/→∅ / /tʃi/
balii-li-chi-h→balii-chi-h

/li/→∅ / /t/
balii-li--h→balii-t

Schwa insertion
 Schwa insertion: when a glottal fricative  or a velar stop  precedes a voiced consonant within a consonant cluster, a schwa  is inserted to break up the consonant cluster.
∅→ / [+voiced] consonant
∅→ / [+voiced] consonant
'ahnih'→/ahənih/

Vowel deletion
 Vowel deletion is the process of a short vowel being deleted at a morpheme boundary. It occurs when an affix containing a short vowel at the morpheme boundary binds to a word that also contains a short vowel at the morpheme boundary.
 For most vowel deletion cases, the preceding short vowel is deleted at the morpheme boundary.
V→∅ / V
/baliili-aatʃĩ-h/→baliilaatʃĩh
 If a class II suffix attaches to a word that results with two short vowels occurring together, the short vowel that follows the class II suffix is deleted.
V→∅ / V
/sa-ibaa-waʃoohah/→sabaa-waʃoohah

Morphology and grammar

Verbal morphology
Choctaw verbs display a wide range of inflectional and derivational morphology. In Choctaw, the category of verb may also include words that would be categorized as adjectives or quantifiers in English. Verbs may be preceded by up to three prefixes and followed by as many as five suffixes. In addition, verb roots may contain infixes that convey aspectual information.

Verb prefixes
The verbal prefixes convey information about the arguments of the verb: how many there are and their person and number features. The prefixes can be divided into three sorts: agreement markers, applicative markers, and anaphors (reflexives and reciprocals). The prefixes occur in the following order: agreement-anaphor-applicative-verb stem.

Agreement affixes
The agreement affixes are shown in the following chart. The only suffix among the personal agreement markers is the first-person singular class I agreement marker /-li/. Third-person is completely unmarked for class I and class II agreement arguments and never indicates number.
 

Some authors (Ulrich 1986, Davies, 1986) refer to class I as actor or nominative, class II as patient or accusative and class III as dative. Broadwell prefers the neutral numbered labels because the actual use of the affixes is more complex. This type of morphology is generally referred to as active–stative and polypersonal agreement.

Class I affixes always indicate the subject of the verb. Class II prefixes usually indicate direct object of active verbs and the subject of stative verbs. Class III prefixes indicate the indirect object of active verbs. A small set of stative psychological verbs have class III subjects; an even smaller set of stative verbs dealing primarily with affect, communication and intimacy have class III direct objects.

Active verbs
As the chart above shows, there is no person-number agreement for third person arguments. Consider the following paradigms:

 
  When the subject and object refer to the same thing or person (coreference), the reflexive ili- prefix is mandatory and used in place of the coreferent object.

Transitive active verbs seemingly with class III direct objects:

 Am-anoli-tok 'She/he/it/they told me.' 
 Chim-anoli-tok 'She/he/it/they told you.'
 Im-anoli-tok 'She/he/it/they told him/her/it/them.'
 Pim-anoli-tok 'She/he/it/they told us.'
 Hachim-anoli-tok 'She/he/it/they told y'all.'

When a transitive verb occurs with more than one agreement prefix, I prefixes precede II and III prefixes:
 Iichipí̱satok.
 Ii-chi-pí̱sa-tok
 1pI-2sII-see-
 'We saw you.'

Ishpimanoolitok.
Ish-pim-anooli-tok.
2sI-1pIII-tell-
'You told us.'

For intransitive verbs, the subjects of active verbs typically have class I agreement. Because third-person objects are unmarked, intransitive active verbs are indistinguishable in form from transitive active verbs with a third-person direct object.

Stative verbs

The subjects of stative verbs typically have II agreement. A small set of psychological verbs have subjects with class III agreement.
Baliililitok.
Baliili-li-tok
run-1sI-
'I ran.'

Saniyah.
Sa-niya-h.
1sII-fat-
'I am fat.'

a̱ponnah.
a̱-ponna-h.
1sIII-skilled-
'I am skilled.'

Negatives

The set of agreement markers labelled N above is used with negatives. Negation is multiply marked, requiring that an agreement marker from the N set replace the ordinary I agreement, the verb appear in the lengthened grade (see discussion below), and that the suffix /-o(k)-/ follow the verb, with deletion of the preceding final vowel. The optional suffix /-kii/ may be added after /-o(k)-/. Consider the following example:
 Akíiyokiittook.
 Ak-íiya-o-kii-ttook
 1sN-go-
 'I did not go.'

Compare this with the affirmative counterpart:
 Iyalittook
 Iya-li-ttook.
 go-1sI-
 'I went'.

To make this example negative, the 1sI suffix /-li/ is replaced by the 1sN prefix /ak-/; the verb root iya is lengthened and accented to yield íiya; the suffix /-o/ is added, the final vowel of iiya is deleted, and the suffix /-kii/ is added.

Anaphoric prefixes
Reflexives are indicated with the /ili-/ prefix, and reciprocals with /itti-/:
 Ilipísalitok.
 Ili-pí̱sa-li-tok.
 -see-1sI-
 'I saw myself'.

Verb suffixes
While the verbal prefixes indicate relations between the verb and its arguments, the suffixes cover a wider semantic range, including information about valence, modality, tense and evidentiality.

The following examples show modal and tense suffixes like /-aachii̱/ 'irrealis'(approximately equal to future), /-tok/ 'past tense', /-h/ 'default tenses':

Baliilih.
Baliili-h.
run-
'She runs.'

Baliilaachi̱h.
Baliili-aachi̱-h.
run-
'She will run.'

There are also suffixes that show evidentiality, or the source of evidence for a statement, as in the following pair:

Nipi' awashlihli.
Nipi' awashli-hli 
meat fry-first:hand
'She fried the meat.' (I saw/heard/smelled her do it.)

Nipi' awashlitoka̱sha.
Nipi' awashli-tok-a̱sha
meat fry--guess
'She fried the meat.' (I guess)

There are also suffixes of illocutionary force which may indicate that the sentence is a question, an exclamation, or a command:

Awashlitoko̱?
Awashli-tok-o̱
fry-
'Did she fry it?'

Chahta' siahokii!
Chahta' si-a-h-okii
Choctaw 1sII-be-
'I'm Choctaw!' or 'I certainly am a Choctaw!'

Verbal infixes
Choctaw verb stems have various infixes that indicate their aspect. These stem variants are traditionally referred to as 'grades'. The table below shows the grades of Choctaw, along with their main usage.

Some examples that show the grades follow:

In this example the l-grade appears because of the suffixes /-na/ 'different subject' and /-o(k)/ 'negative':

... lowat táahana falaamat akíiyokiittook.
lowa-t táaha-na falaama-t ak-íiya-o-kii-ttook
burn- complete- return- 1sN-go-
'... (the school) burned down and I didn't go back.'

The g-grade and y-grade typically get translated into English as "finally VERB-ed":

Taloowah.
Taloowa-h 
sing- 
'He sang.'

Tálloowah.
Tálloowa-h 
sing- 
'He finally sang.'

The hn-grade is usually translated as 'kept on VERBing':

Ohó̱bana nittak pókkooli' oshtattook.
Ohó̱ba-na nittak pókkooli' oshta-ttook
rain- day ten four-
'It kept on raining for forty days.'

The h-grade is usually translated "just VERB-ed" or "VERB-ed for a short time":

.
Nóhsi-h
sleep-
'He took a quick nap.

Nominal morphology

Noun prefixes
Nouns have prefixes that show agreement with a possessor. Agreement markers from class II are used on a lexically specified closed class of nouns, which includes many (but not all) of the kinship terms and body parts. This is the class that is generally labeled inalienable.

sanoshkobo''' 'my head'
sa-noshkobo' 
1sII-headchinoshkobo 'your head' 
chi-noshkobo'
2sII-head

noshkobo 'his/her/its/their head' 
noshkobo' 
head

sashki 'my mother' 
sa-ishki' 
1sII-mother

chishki''' 'your mother' 
chi-ishki'
2sII-mother

Nouns that are not lexically specified for II agreement use the III agreement markers:a̱ki 'my father'
a̱-ki' 
1sIII-fatheramofi 'my dog' 
am-ofi'
1sIII-dog

Although systems of this type are generally described with the terms alienable and inalienable, this terminology is not particularly appropriate for Choctaw, since alienability implies a semantic distinction between types of nouns. The morphological distinction between nouns taking II agreement and III agreement in Choctaw only partly coincides with the semantic notion of alienability.

Noun suffixes
Choctaw nouns can be followed by various determiner and case-marking suffixes, as in the following examples, where we see
determiners such as /-ma/ 'that', /-pa/ 'this', and /-akoo/ 'contrast' and case-markers /-(y)at/ 'nominative' and /-(y)a̱/ 'accusative':alla' naknimatalla' nakni-m-at
child male-that-
'that boy (nominative)'Hoshiit itti chaahamako̱ o̱biniilih.Hoshi'-at itti' chaaha-m-ako̱ o̱-biniili-h 
bird- tree tall-that- -sit- 
'The bird is sitting on that tall tree.' (Not on the short one.)

The last example shows that nasalizing the last vowel of the preceding N is a common way to show the accusative case.

Word order and case marking
The simplest sentences in Choctaw consist of a verb and a tense marker, as in the following examples:o̱batok.o̱ba-tok
rain-
'It rained.'Niyah.niya-h
fat-
'She/he/it is fat, they are fat.'Pí̱satok.pí̱sa-tok
see-
'She/he/it/they saw her/him/it/them.'

As these examples show, there are no obligatory noun phrases in a Choctaw sentence, nor is there any verbal agreement that indicates a third person subject or object. There is no indication of grammatical gender, and for third person arguments there is no indication of number. (There are, however, some verbs with suppletive forms that indicate the number of a subject or object, e.g. iyah 'to go (sg.)', ittiyaachih 'to go (du.)', and ilhkolih 'to go (pl)'.)

When there is an overt subject, it is obligatorily marked with the nominative case /-at/. Subjects precede the verbHoshiyat apatok.hoshi'-at apa-tok 
bird- eat- 
'The birds ate them.'

When there is an overt object, it is optionally marked with the accusative case /-a̱/Hoshiyat sho̱shi(-ya̱) apatok.hoshi'-at sho̱shi'(-a̱) apa-tok.
bird- bug-() eat-
'The birds ate the bugs.'

The Choctaw sentence is normally verb-final, and so the head of the sentence is last.

Some other phrases in Choctaw also have their head at the end. Possessors precede the possessed noun in the Noun Phrase:ofi' hohchifo
dog name 
'the dog's name'

Choctaw has postpositional phrases with the postposition after its object:

tamaaha' bili̱ka
town near
'near a town'

Examples
Some common Choctaw phrases (written in the "Modern" orthography):

Choctaw: 
hi: 
See you later!: 
number: 
Thank you: 
What is your name?: 
My name is...: 
yes: 
no: 
okay: 
I don't understand.: 
I don't know.: 
Do you speak Choctaw?: 
What is that?: 

Other Choctaw words:

Cherokee: 
Chickasaw: 
Seminole: 
Creek/Muskogee: 
today: 
tonight: 
tomorrow: 
yesterday: 
month: 
year/2009: 
house: 
school: 
cat: 
dog: 
cow: 
horse: 

Counting to twenty:

one: 
two: toklo
three: 
four: 
five: 
six: 
seven: 
eight: 
nine: 
ten: 
eleven: 
twelve: 
thirteen: 
fourteen: 
fifteen: 
sixteen: 
seventeen: 
eighteen: 
nineteen: 
twenty: 

At "Native Nashville" web , there is an Online Choctaw Language Tutor, with Pronunciation Guide and four lessons: Small Talk, Animals, Food and Numbers.

See also

Choctaw Code Talkers

References

Sources
 Broadwell, George Aaron. (2006). A Choctaw Reference Grammar. Lincoln, NE: University of Nebraska Press. .

Further reading
 Broadwell, George Aaron. (1991). "Speaker and self in Choctaw". International Journal of American Linguistics, 57, 411-425.
 Byington, Cyrus. (1915). A dictionary of the Choctaw language. J. R. Swanton & H. S. Halbert (Eds.). Bureau of American Ethnology bulletin 46. Washington, D.C.: Government Printing Office. (Reprinted 1973 & 1978).
 Davies, William. (1986). Choctaw verb agreement and universal grammar. Reidel.
 Downing, Todd. (1974). Chahta anompa: An introduction to the Choctaw language (3rd ed.). Durant, OK: Choctaw Bilingual Education Program, Southeastern Oklahoma State University.
 Haag, Marcia, and Willis, Henry. (2001). Choctaw Language & Culture: Chahta Anumpa, University of Oklahoma Press.
 Haag, Marcia, and Fowler, Loretta. (2001). Chahta Anumpa: A Choctaw Tutorial CD-ROM, University of Oklahoma Press.
 Heath, Jeffrey. (1977). Choctaw cases. Proceedings of the Berkeley Linguistic Society, 3, 204-213.
 Heath, Jeffrey. (1980). Choctaw suppletive verbs and derivational morphology.
 Howard, Gregg; Eby, Richard; Jones, Charles G. (1991). Introduction to Choctaw: A primer for learning to speak, read and write the Choctaw language. Fayetteville, AR: VIP Pub.
 Jacob, Betty. (1980). Choctaw and Chickasaw. Abstract of paper delivered at the 1978 Muskogean conference. International Journal of American Linguistics, 46, 43.
 Jacob, Betty; Nicklas, Thurston Dale; & Spencer, Betty Lou. (1977). Introduction to Choctaw. Durant, OK: Choctaw Bilingual Education Program, Southeastern Oklahoma State University.
 Mithun, Marianne. (1999). The languages of Native North America. Cambridge: Cambridge University Press.  (hbk); .
 Munro, Pamela. (1987). Some morphological differences between Chickasaw and Choctaw. In P. Munro (Ed.), Muskogean linguistics (pp. 119–133). Los Angeles: University of California at Los Angeles, Department of Linguistics.
 Munro, Pamela (Ed.). (1987). Muskogean linguistics. UCLA occasional papers in linguistics (No. 6). Los Angeles: University of California at Los Angeles, Department of Linguistics.
 Nicklas, Thurston Dale. (1974). The elements of Choctaw. (Doctoral dissertation, University of Michigan, Ann Arbor).
 Nicklas, Thurston Dale. (1975). Choctaw morphophonemics. In J. Crawford (Ed.), Studies in southeastern Indian languages (pp. 237–249). Athens: University of Georgia.
 Nicklas, Thurston Dale. (1979). Reference grammar of the Choctaw language. Durant, OK: Choctaw Bilingual Education Program, Southeastern Oklahoma State University.
 Pulte, William. (1975). The position of Chickasaw in Western Muskogean. In J. Crawford (Ed.), Studies in southeastern Indian languages (pp. 251–263). Athens: University of Georgia.
 Ulrich, Charles H. (1986). Choctaw morphophonology. (Doctoral dissertation, University of California, Los Angeles).
 Ulrich, Charles H. (1987). Choctaw g-grades and y-grades. In P. Munro (Ed.), Muskogean linguistics (pp. 171–178). Los Angeles: University of California at Los Angeles, Department of Linguistics.
 Ulrich, Charles H. (1987). Choctaw verb grades and the nature of syllabification. In A. Bosch, B. Need, & E. Schiller (Eds.), Papers from the 23rd annual regional meeting. Chicago: Chicago Linguistic Society.
 Ulrich, Charles H. (1988). The morphophonology of Choctaw verb roots and valence suffixes. In W. Shipley (Ed.), In honor of Mary Haas: From the Haas Festival conference on Native American linguistics (pp. 805–818). Berlin: Mouton de Gruyter. ISBN

External links

 Cyrus Byington (1870) Grammar of the Choctaw Language, American Philosophical Society
 Cyrus Byington (1852) "English and Choctaw Definer"
Choctaw Dictionary
Allen Wright (1880) Chahta leksikon
Ben Watkins (1892) Complete Choctaw definer
Mississippi Band of Choctaw Indians
Choctaw Nation of Oklahoma
Broadwell, Grammatical Sketch of Choctaw
https://choctawschool.com/media/369055/New%20Choctaw%20Dictionary.pdf

Agglutinative languages
Choctaw culture
Indigenous languages of the North American Southeast
Indigenous languages of Oklahoma
Mississippi culture
Muskogean languages
Subject–object–verb languages
Native American language revitalization